Arjun Vajpai (born 9 June 1993) is an Indian mountaineer, who climbed  Mount Everest in 2010 at the age of 16 years, 11 months and 18 days, becoming the youngest Indian to climb Everest at that time. He is a good climber.  He broke a record set by Krushnaa Patil of Maharashtra who climbed the Everest at the age of 19. 
On 20 May 2011, he became the Youngest person ever to summit Lhotse, aged 17 years, 11 months and 16 days. Vajpai also climbed Manaslu on 4 October 2011. After 3 failed attempts on Mount Makalu, he climbed it on 22 May 2016, during his fourth attempt.

Arjun Vajpai scaled Cho Oyu accompanied by Pasang Norbu Sherpa and Lakpa Sherpa.
 
Arjun Vajpai is the son of Col. Sanjeev Vajpai and Priya Vajpai from Noida. He studied at Ryan International School, Noida and has been fascinated by trekking and mountaineering since his childhood. He underwent training at the Nehru Institute of Mountaineering, Uttarkashi, Uttarakhand.

The Swiss adventurer Olivier Racine came to his rescue giving him appropriate medicine.

Summits so far
2010 : Mount Everest (8,849 m)

2011 : Manaslu (8,163 m)2011 : Lhotse (8,516 m)2016 : Cho Oyu (8,188 m)2016 : Makalu (8,485 m)

2018 : Kangchenjunga (8,586 m)

See also
Indian summiters of Mount Everest - Year wise
List of Mount Everest summiters by number of times to the summit
List of Mount Everest records of India
List of Mount Everest records

References 

1993 births
Living people
Indian summiters of Mount Everest